Seán Kenny (1923 – 24 April 2002) was an Irish sportsperson.  He played hurling with his local club Borris–Ileigh and was a member of the Tipperary senior inter-county team in the 1940s and 1950s.  Kenny captained Tipperary to the All-Ireland title in 1950.

Early life

Seán Kenny was born in Borrisoleigh, County Tipperary in 1923.  He was born into a family that had a strong association with the game of hurling.  His uncle, Patrick Harty, captained the Tipperary team that won the All-Ireland junior title in 1930.  Kenny was educated at the local national school and later attended Thurles CBS where his own hurling skills were developed.  In 1939 he captained the school to both Dean Ryan (under-17) and Dr. Harty Cup (under-19) titles.

Playing career

Club

Kenny played his club hurling with his local club in Borris–Ileigh and enjoyed much success. He was captain of the club team in 1949 as Borris–Ileigh defeated Kickham's to take their very first senior county championship.  Kenny added a second county winners' medal to his collection in 1950 as Borris-Ileigh retained their title.  He captured a third and final county title in 1953.

Inter-county

Kenny first came to prominence on the inter-county scene in 1941 when he captained the Tipperary minor hurling team in the Munster final.  Cork, however, were the victors that day.

Kenny's skill at club level was quickly noted and he soon made it onto the Tipperary senior hurling team.  It was in his debut season that he enjoyed his first major success when Tipp defeated Limerick by 1-16 to 2-10, giving Kenny a Munster winners' medal.  He subsequently lined out in his first ALl-Ireland final at senior level.  Surprisingly, Laois were the opponents on that occasion, however, the result was expected.  Tipp opened the floodgates with a Paddy Kenny goal before Jimmy Kennedy added two more goals in the second-half.  At the full-time whistle Tipp were the victors by 3-11 to 0-3 and Kenny had captured an All-Ireland.

In 1950 Kenny was captain of the team as he added a National Hurling League winners' medal to his collection before further provincial glory followed.  A 2-17 to 3-11 defeat of Cork gave him a second consecutive Munster medal and an easy passage into another All-Ireland final.  Kilkenny provided the opposition on that occasion in a close but uninteresting game.  At the final whistle Tipp emerged the victors by 1-9 to 1-8 giving Kenny a second All-Ireland medal.  He also had the honour of lifting the Liam MacCarthy Cup on behalf of his county.

In 1951 Kenny was captain of the team again, however, his intercounty activity was curtailed due to an injury he sustained in a provincial game against Waterford.  He missed Tipp's third consecutive Munster final triumph, however, he came on as a substitute in the subsequent All-Ireland final.  Nicky Rackard had been Wexford's star goal-poacher throughout the year, however, his artistry was beaten by Tony Reddin in the Tipperary goal-mouth in that game.  Séamus Bannon, Tim Ryan and Paddy Kenny got the goals in the second quarter that did the damage, however, Tipp forged ahead to win by 7-7 to 3-9.  It was Kenny's third consecutive All-Ireland medal.

Kenny’s career at inter-county level ended shortly after that game as a chronic knee injury forced him to retire.

Provincial

Kenny also won two Railway Cup medals with Munster in 1949 and 1950 (as captain).

References

1923 births
2002 deaths
Borris-Ileigh hurlers
Tipperary inter-county hurlers
Munster inter-provincial hurlers
All-Ireland Senior Hurling Championship winners